The ariakehimeshirauo, Neosalanx reganius, is a species of icefish in the family Salangidae endemic to Japan. It is only known from Midori and Chikugo Rivers in Kyushu. It seems to be relatively rare in its limited habitat, and is classified as an endangered species by IUCN.

N. reganius is an estuarine species, usually found in turbid waters with low salinity, or in fresh water. It is a planktivore. Relative to its size, it is highly fecund (347–1071 eggs per female), and the ovaries of gravid females made up 44% of their total body weight, on average.

References

Neosalanx
Fish described in 1937
Fish of Japan
Taxonomy articles created by Polbot